Gelweita, also known as Las Galwayta or Galwayta is an archaeological site and a key rock art site in the eastern Sanaag region of Somaliland.

Overview 
Gelweita is at an altitude of 7500ft and is near a plateau. The archeological site is approximately 40km or 25 miles west of Las Khorey. The site dates back thousands of years and is evidence of an earlier stone-age culture that inhabited the area.

John Hanning Speke, an English explorer who made an exploratory expedition to the area in an attempt to reach the Nugaal Valley, described the site:

He also remarked the favourable position that Gelweita lies in for a potential Somali settlement, however the tense relations between the Habr Gerhajis and the Warsangali, the Habr Gerhajis being the proprietors of the area, along with the Warsangali's lack of manpower made that impossible.

Demographics 
The area serves as the frontier between the Habr Yunis sub-division of the Garhajis Isaaq and the Warsangeli sub-division of the Harti Darod.

See also
Administrative divisions of Somaliland
Regions of Somaliland
Districts of Somaliland
Somalia–Somaliland border

References 

Archaeological sites in Somaliland
Sanaag
Archaeological sites of Eastern Africa